Eastman Canyon Creek is a perennial stream in Santa Clara County, California, United States.  The headwaters rise on the eastern flank of Croy Ridge in the Santa Cruz Mountains, and flow eastward, eventually emptying into the Uvas Reservoir.

Eastman Canyon Road follows alongside the creek for most of its length, ending at the intersection with Uvas Road.

See also
 Riparian zone
 List of watercourses in the San Francisco Bay Area

References

External links
 Map of Eastman Canyon Creek

Rivers of Santa Clara County, California
Rivers of Northern California